Irvine Luther Lenroot (January 31, 1869 – January 26, 1949) was a United States representative and United States senator from Wisconsin and an associate judge of the United States Court of Customs and Patent Appeals.

Education and career

Born on January 31, 1869, in Superior, Wisconsin, Lenroot attended the common schools, then attended Parsons Business College in Duluth, Minnesota and read law in 1897. He was a logger and reporter for the Douglas County, Wisconsin Superior Court from 1893 to 1906. He was admitted to the bar and entered private practice in Superior in 1898. He was a member of the Wisconsin State Assembly from 1901 to 1907, serving as Speaker from 1903 to 1907.

Congressional service

Lenroot was elected as a Republican from the 11th congressional district to the United States House of Representatives of the 61st United States Congress and to the four succeeding Congresses and served from March 4, 1909, until April 17, 1918, when he resigned, having been elected Senator. He was elected as a Republican to the United States Senate on April 2, 1918, to fill the vacancy caused by the death of United States Senator Paul O. Husting. He was reelected in 1920 and served from April 18, 1918, to March 3, 1927. He was an unsuccessful candidate for renomination in 1926. He was Chairman of the Committee on Railroads in the 66th United States Congress, Committee on Public Lands and Surveys in the 68th United States Congress and the Committee on Public Buildings and Grounds in the 69th United States Congress. He resumed the practice of law in Washington, D.C. from 1927 to 1929.

1920 Republican Convention

Lenroot attended the 1920 Republican National Convention at the Chicago Coliseum, and after the selection of Warren G. Harding of Ohio as the nominee for president, party leaders decided that the progressive Lenroot would be a balance to a ticket with the more conservative Harding. By Saturday night, June 12, many of the delegates had gone home, along with most of the party bosses. After Lenroot's name had been placed in nomination and seconded but before a vote could be taken, an Oregon delegate, Wallace McCamant, nominated Calvin Coolidge of Massachusetts for vice president. Unfettered by party bosses, the delegates weighed in for Coolidge, who received 674 votes to Lenroot's 146 and won on the first ballot.

Federal judicial service

Lenroot was nominated by President Herbert Hoover on April 22, 1929, to an Associate Judge seat on the United States Court of Customs and Patent Appeals vacated by Associate Judge Orion M. Barber. He was confirmed by the United States Senate on May 17, 1929, and received his commission the same day. His service terminated on April 30, 1944, due to his retirement. He died on January 26, 1949, in Washington, D.C. He was interred in Greenwood Cemetery in Superior. The Associated Press report of his death began, "Former Senator Irvine L. Lenroot of Wisconsin, the man who might have been the 30th President of the United States, died Wednesday night."

Personal life
Lenroot married Clara Clough of Superior, who wrote a short memoir of her girlhood in Wisconsin in the 1860s and 1870s. His daughter, Katherine Lenroot, was known for successfully lobbying for the Fair Labor Standards Act and the enforcing of child labor laws.

References

External links

 

1869 births
1949 deaths
Judges of the United States Court of Customs and Patent Appeals
Republican Party members of the Wisconsin State Assembly
Politicians from Superior, Wisconsin
Republican Party members of the United States House of Representatives from Wisconsin
Republican Party United States senators from Wisconsin
Speakers of the Wisconsin State Assembly
United States Article I federal judges appointed by Herbert Hoover
20th-century American judges
Candidates in the 1920 United States presidential election
20th-century American politicians